Kimsquit is a former village of the Nuxalk at the mouth of the Dean River on the northeast side of Dean Channel in the Central Coast region of British Columbia, Canada.

The village was shelled by the Royal Navy in 1877.

References

External links
image of Kimsquit Village prior to its destruction in 1877

Nuxalk
Central Coast of British Columbia
Kitimat Ranges
Indigenous conflicts in Canada